City A.M. is a free business-focused newspaper distributed in and around London, England, with an accompanying website. Its certified distribution was 67,000 copies a day in January 2023, according to statistics compiled by the ABC, and has a digital audience of just over 2 million unique visitors a month.

Ownership
City A.M. Limited, is owned by the Blue Bull Limited, Nashco Limited, and founders Jens Torpe and Lawson Muncaster.

History
City A.M. was launched in September 2005 and operates as an independent media company.

City A.M.s editor is Andy Silvester, who replaced Christian May in November 2020. The paper employs an editorial team of 27 across its four daily sections – news, business features and investment, lifestyle and sport. Its pagination averages around 32 tabloid full-colour pages a day.

City A.M.s launch editor was former Sunday Times and Sunday Express journalist David Parsley. He was succeeded by Allister Heath, who joined in February 2008 and was editor for six years. He was previously the editor of The Business, a weekly magazine which closed in February 2008. David Hellier, formerly of The Independent and the Daily and Sunday Express, replaced Heath and served until 2015 when he was replaced by May.

Content
The news section is primarily made up of corporate, financial and economic stories, as well as political and regulatory stories relevant to its readership. The paper regularly runs interviews of business leaders. The news pages also contain a variety of corporate and economic comment. The business features section is primarily dominated by investment, trading and wealth management pieces but also includes a range of articles on other business topics. The lifestyle pages cover a vast range of subject matters, including travel, restaurant reviews, food, fashion, technology, books, arts, entertainment, motoring and property. The sport section reports and comments on all the major events and games, with a bias towards sports of interest to London-based professionals.

The paper's philosophy is broadly supportive of the free-market economy, of capitalism, of private enterprise and of the City of London and those who work in it. It endorsed the Conservative Party at the 2010 general election but was critical of several of the coalition's policies subsequently. In 2014, former editor Allister Heath argued that London and the south-east should be entitled to a greater rebate of UK tax revenue and has approved of the principle of London's becoming an independent city state. He also supported introducing a single income tax rate of 30% on personal earnings, dividends, rent and interest.

The paper's front page is dominated by a large capitalised banner headline reminiscent of a traditional UK popular newspaper. The rest of the news stories, as well as the commentary and features, come in bite-sized chunks, in a modern compact-style format illustrated with images, bullet points and diagrams.

The newspaper includes a debate column in the comments section, which involves politicians with an opposite view on a subject, such as on Brexit or economic reform, give short answers explaining their case.

City A.M. is also one of the only newspapers in the UK with a dedicated weekly crypto and blockchain technology column.

Former editor Christian May voted for Brexit, saying his vote was grounded in social and economic liberalism with a pro-immigration stance. May acknowledges there was an institutional City view in favour of Remain.

Alongside the newspaper, other initiatives include The Magazine, a bi-monthly lifestyle magazine for City professionals, and the City A.M. Awards, an annual event that celebrates London's individuals and companies. The publication also runs its own content marketing platform, City Talk, that allows partners to publish content to the platform, representing the voices and views of the City beyond the editorial staff.

Distribution
The newspaper is published in print Monday to Thursday with a "digital edition" on Fridays, and is distributed at more than 400 selected commuter hubs across London and the Home Counties, as well as over 500 offices throughout the City, Canary Wharf and other areas of high business concentration, with an average daily circulation of 67,090 copies as of January 2023. It is typically available from around 6am at London commuter stations and is handed out at key points in the City, Canary Wharf and other central London locations.

There are now three principal free newspapers in London: Metro (which also distributes nationally), City A.M., and the London Evening Standard. City A.M. is aimed at private-sector workers, especially those in finance, professional and business services and corporations, and those who are interested in investing and personal finance.

Website
The newspaper announced a major digital expansion in March 2014 and appointed Metros head of digital content Martin Ashplant to be its digital and social media director. Chief executive Jens Torpe said at the time that he expected the website audience to grow to be bigger than the printed version. In October 2014, City A.M. reported that it had seen its website traffic grow almost three-fold in a year. In 2015, cityam.com became the first UK newspaper website to prevent users with ad blockers switched on from reading content.

References

External links
 

Business newspapers published in the United Kingdom
London newspapers
Free daily newspapers
Publications established in 2005
Media and communications in the City of London
2005 establishments in the United Kingdom
Daily newspapers published in the United Kingdom